Pho Si Suwan is a district (amphoe) in the northwestern part of Sisaket province, northeastern Thailand.

History
The minor district (king amphoe) was established on 30 April 1994, when it was split off from Uthumphon Phisai district.

On 15 May 2007, all 81 minor districts were upgraded to full districts. On 24 August the upgrade became official.

Geography
Neighboring districts are (from the north clockwise) Bueng Bun, Uthumphon Phisai, and Mueang Chan of Sisaket Province, and Rattanaburi of Surin province.

Administration
The district is divided into five sub-districts (tambons), which are further subdivided into 80 villages (mubans). There are no municipal (thesaban) areas. There are five tambon administrative organizations (TAO).

References

External links
amphoe.com

Pho Si Suwan